Bongani Michael Baloyi (born 28 February 1987) is a South African politician. In 2013, he was elected Executive Mayor of the Midvaal Local Municipality. He was only 26 years old at the time, and he consequently became the youngest mayor in South Africa. From 2011 to 2013, he was the MMC for Development and Planning in the municipality.

Early life and education
Baloyi was born on 28 February 1987 in the Thokoza township outside Alberton in the East Rand. He took an interest in politics at a young age. His grandmother is an active member of the African National Congress Women's League. In 1999, he and his newly-divorced mother Patricia, an entrepreneur, and two siblings moved to Daleside, Meyerton. Baloyi has two uncompleted degrees: one in accounting and another one in Business Administration, which he plans to complete in 2022.

Political career
Baloyi became a member of the Democratic Alliance in 2005.  He was a member of the Vaal Region Executive Committee, the Provincial Executive Committee and the Federal Council. He was a participant of the DA's Young Leaders Programme.

In 2011, he was elected as a proportional representation councillor of the Midvaal municipality and became the MMC for Development and Planning. Incumbent mayor Timothy Nast resigned in July 2013 following his appointment to the Gauteng Planning Commission. Baloyi was chosen as his successor and took office on 29 August 2013. He won a full term as mayor in August 2016.

Under Baloyi's leadership, Midvaal achieved seven consecutive unqualified audits. The municipality went from being the 16th best-performing municipality in 2013 to the 5th best in the national rankings. In March 2020, he announced that he would not seek another term as mayor in 2021. Baloyi had been mentioned as a possible DA leadership candidate. His term as Executive Mayor came to an end on 1 November 2021.

On 20 December 2021, Baloyi announced on his Twitter account that he had resigned from the DA to pursue other opportunities. He said that he had left out of his "own agency" and denied that he was being purged.

Career in ActionSA
On January 24, 2022 Baloyi joined ActionSA.  He did not join out of anger or hatred, instead he joined for the hope of ActionSA. Baloyi said that he had applied to be the party's premier candidate in the 2024 provincial election. In an interview with the Sunday Times in late-January 2022, Baloyi said that he had left the DA because the DA became "extremely toxic" after former party leader Helen Zille was elected chairperson of the party's Federal Council in October 2019. Baloyi was promoted to provincial chairperson of the party in May 2022 after John Moodey was appointed the party's national director of operations.

Baloyi resigned from ActionSA in March 2023 due to irreconcilable differences between him and party leadership. He had decline an offer to become party spokesperson and a member of the party's Senate.

Incidents 
Baloyi and an ANC member were arrested on 29 September 2018 after laying assault charges against one another, following an incident at an Arbor Day event in Savannah City. He was released on bail and his assault case was later withdrawn.

References

Living people
1987 births
People from Alberton, Gauteng
People from Gauteng
Democratic Alliance (South Africa) politicians
South African politicians
Mayors of places in South Africa
ActionSA politicians